The 1999 Euro Beach Soccer Cup was the second Euro Beach Soccer Cup, one of Europe's two major beach soccer championships at the time, held in September 1999, in Alicante, Spain.

Four teams participated in the tournament, which was played as part of the 1999 World Series.  The World Series was played in 2 groups of 4 teams - a World Group (for non-European teams) and a European Group, which doubled as the Euro Beach Soccer Cup for 1999. Both groups played in a knock-out format, with semi-finals followed by a third place match and a final.

Hosts Spain won the championship, with Portugal finishing second. France beat Italy in the third place play off to finish third and fourth respectively.

Winners Spain went on to play the winners of the World Group, Brazil, in the final of the 1999 World Series, ultimately losing 7–1.

Participating nations

Matches

Main tournament

Winners

Final standings

References

Euro Beach Soccer Cup
1999 in beach soccer